Miklós Vig (11 July 1898 – 19 December 1944) was a Hungarian cabaret and jazz singer, actor, comedian and theater secretary in the 1920s, 1930s, and 1940s. Born in Budapest on 11 July 1898, he was murdered there on 19 December 1944 by members of the Arrow Cross.

Background and biography

Early life
Vig was born Miklós Voglhut in 1898 to Vilmos Vogelhut (1867-1942) and Roza Vogelhut (1870-1942) in a Hungarian Jewish family in Budapest, Hungary. Although he went to acting school, he had better success as a cabaret singer. In 1924 as his career was picking up he changed his surname to Vig, because Voglhut was a Jewish-sounding name and antisemitism was growing at the time. Vig means cheerful or merry in Hungarian.

Family
Other musicians from the Vig family include Vig's brother, saxophone and clarinet player György Vig, and his nephew, jazz musician Tommy Vig. Another nephew, John Vig, is a physicist and was president of the Institute of Electrical and Electronics Engineers in 2009.

Murder
The fact that Vig was married to a Catholic woman, Kató Szőke, and the fact that he changed his name, did not save him from the Holocaust. On 19 December 1944 he was among a group of Jews who were bound, lined up along the banks of the Danube and machine-gunned into the river by Hungarian Nazis, members of the Arrow Cross Party. The Shoes on the Danube Promenade commemorates those who were murdered in this fashion.

Music and comedy

Vig had his first major successes as a soloist, and later performed frequently in other cabarets including the Budapest Operetta Theatre and Budapest Orfeum. Although he made many recordings, he became most famous as a singer of popular music on the radio. A 1935 article in Színházi Élet described Vig as a singer of popular sentimental songs.

According to Gramofon (the Hungarian Jazz and Classical music magazine), Vig was considered part of the first generation of recorded Hungarian musicians. When Deutsche Gramophone found themselves falling behind the competition, they signed Vig, who became their first dance-music star.

As a comedian, he performed in the early 1920s at various cabarets including the Rakéta Kabaré, occasionally with female partner Annus Nagy.

Discography

References

External links
Audio Samples

1898 births
1944 deaths
Hungarian comedians
Hungarian jazz singers
20th-century Hungarian male singers
Hungarian male musical theatre actors
Hungarian male stage actors
Jewish cabaret performers
Polydor Records artists
Musicians from Budapest
Jewish male comedians
Jewish singers
Jewish Hungarian actors
Cabaret singers
Male actors from Budapest
20th-century comedians
Male jazz musicians
People executed by Hungary by firing squad
People executed by the Government of National Unity (Hungary)